A squat toilet  (or squatting toilet) is a toilet used by squatting, rather than sitting. This means that the posture for defecation and for female urination is to place one foot on each side of the toilet drain or hole and to squat over it. There are several types of squat toilets, but they all consist essentially of a toilet pan or bowl at floor level. Such a toilet pan is also called a "squatting pan".  A squat toilet may use a water seal and therefore be a flush toilet, or it can be without a water seal and therefore be a dry toilet. The term "squat" refers only to the expected defecation posture and not any other aspects of toilet technology, such as whether it is water flushed or not. 

Squat toilets are used all over the world, but are particularly common in some Asian and African nations, as well as in some Muslim countries. In many of those countries, anal cleansing with water is also the cultural norm and easier to perform than with toilets used in a sitting position. They are also occasionally found in some European and South American countries. Squat toilets are regarded as traditional by many, and are being phased out in favour of sitting toilets or even high-tech sitting toilets.

In 1976, squatting toilets were said to be used by the majority of the world's population. However, there is a general trend in many countries to move from squatting toilets to sitting toilets (particularly in urban areas) as the latter are often regarded as more modern.

Design 

Squat toilets are arranged at floor level, which requires the individual to squat with bent knees. In contrast to a pedestal or a sitting toilet, the opening of the drain pipe is located at the ground level.

Squatting slabs can be made of porcelain (ceramic), stainless steel, fibreglass, or in the case of low-cost versions in developing countries, with concrete, ferrocement, plastic, or wood covered with linoleum. Slabs can also be made of wood (timber), but need to be treated with preservatives, such as paint or linoleum, to prevent rotting and to enable thorough cleaning of the squatting slab.

There are two design variations: one where the toilet is level with the ground, and the other where it is raised on a platform approximately 30 cm (1 ft). The latter is easier to use for people who urinate while standing, but both types can be used for this purpose. There is also no difference for defecation or squatting urination.

Use 

The user stands over the squat toilet facing the hood and pulls down (up in the case of skirts or dress) their trousers and underwear to the knees. The user then squats over the hole, as close to the front as possible, as excrement tends to fall onto the rear edge of the in-floor receptacle if the user squats too far back.

Health, hygiene and maintenance

The standing surface of the squatting pan should be kept clean and dry in order to prevent disease transmission and to limit odors.

Squat toilets are usually easier to clean than sitting toilets (pedestals), except that one has to bend down further if the squatting pan needs manual scrubbing. They can be cleaned by using a mop and hose, together with the rest of the floor space in the toilet room or cubicle.

Some people claim that squat toilets are more hygienic, due to the lack of direct contact with the seat. Seat contact is not a real health risk, however, and squat toilets allow splatter on one's own legs and feet.

Health effects
Sitting toilets require users to strain in an unnatural position. In the sitting position, the puborectalis muscle chokes the rectum, and the anorectal angle is unfavorable, at almost 90 degrees. This may lead to constipation symptoms such as incomplete evacuation of stool, irregular bowel movements, hard stools and the need for excessive straining. Compared to the more natural squatting position, western-style toilets may lead to health issues such as inflamed hemorrhoids.

The squatting defecation posture is more physiological, ideal and relaxed. This is because it allows for better relaxation of the puborectalis muscle and hence straightening of the anorectal angle, and for faster, easier and more complete evacuation of stool. The squatting position therefore prevents excessive straining, and hence protects against stretching of the nerves, such as the pudendal nerve. Damage of these nerves can lead to permanent problems with urinary, defecation and sexual function. The squatting position also increases intraabdominal pressure. The squatting position is often recommended as part of a range of measures to manage constipation and its subtyptes, including obstructed defecation syndrome and dyssynergic defecation. Chronic, excessive straining during defecation, which is more likely to be needed in the sitting position, may be associated with the development of inflamed hemorrhoids or any of the spectrum of pelvic organ prolapse disorders, such as rectocele, rectal prolapse, etc.

However, according to some sources, excessive straining in the squatting position while defecating may increase the risk of severe hemorrhoids, or increase the tendency of prolapse of hemorroids, because of increased perineal descent and intra-abdominal pressure. Prolonged and repeated straining on a sitting toilet has the same effect.

Society and culture

Perceptions and trends 
There are two different attitudes towards squat toilets, largely dependent on what users are used to, or whether the toilet is at a public or private place:
Some people regard squat toilets as more hygienic compared to sitting toilets. They might be easier to clean and there is no skin contact with the surface of the toilet seat. For that reason, some people perceive them as more hygienic, particularly for public toilets.

Some people regard sitting toilets as "more modern" than squat toilets. Sitting toilets have a lower risk of soiling clothing or shoes, as urine is less likely to splash on bottom parts of trousers or shoes. Furthermore, sitting toilets are more convenient for people with disabilities and the elderly.

A trend towards more sitting toilets in countries that were traditionally using squat toilets can be observed in some urban and more affluent areas, in areas with new buildings (as well as hotels and airports) or in tourist regions.

Public toilets 

Squat toilets are used in public toilets, rather than household toilets, because they are perceived by some as easier to clean and more hygienic, therefore potentially more appropriate for general public use. For instance, this is the case in parts of France, Italy, Greece, or the Balkans, where such toilets are somewhat common in public toilets (restrooms).

Preferences by country or region 

The following general statements can be made:
 Squat toilets are common in many Asian countries, including China and India. They are also widespread in Indonesia, Bangladesh, Pakistan, Sri Lanka, Malaysia, Myanmar, Iran and Iraq. They can be found in nations like Japan, South Korea, Taiwan, Thailand, and Singapore.
 People in sub-Saharan African countries, especially in rural areas, widely use squat toilets, for example in Kenya, Rwanda, Somalia, Tanzania, and Uganda.
Much of the world's population use squat toilets, especially in rural areas of developing countries.
 Countries in the Middle East and North Africa often have both types of toilets, i.e. sitting and squatting.
 In Hindu or Muslim cultures, the prevalence of squat toilets is generally quite high, as is the practice of anal cleansing with water.
 In Latin and South America, flush toilets are always of the sitting type, whereas dry toilets may be either of the sitting or a squatting type. The occurrence of squat toilets in urban areas of Latin America appears to be rather low.
Squat toilets are rare in Australia, New Zealand, United States, Canada, and countries in Northern and Western Europe (except public toilets in France). Where they do exist, they have usually been installed to accommodate visitors, tourists, students, or recent migrants from places that use squatting toilets traditionally.

Europe 

In Southern and Eastern Europe including parts of France, in Greece, Albania, Balkans, and Russia they are common, especially in public toilets. But the trend in Russia is to move away from squat toilets. Squat pit latrine toilets are present in some rural areas of Eastern Europe.

Squat toilets are generally non-existent in Northern and Western Europe. France and Italy are an exception and have some squat toilets remaining in old buildings and public toilets because they used to be the norm there in the early 20th century. In BMW Welt in Munich, the public restrooms have some stalls with squat toilets.

China 
Many areas in China have traditional squat toilets instead of sitting toilets, especially in public toilets. Nevertheless, sitting toilets have increasingly become the norm in major urban areas and cities. Sitting toilets are on the one hand associated with development and modernization, and on the other hand with reduced hygiene and possible transmission of diseases.

Japan 

Although in Japan it is believed that the squat toilet is traditional, the trend in Japan is to move away from squat toilets: According to Toto, one of Japan's major toilet manufacturers, the production of Western-style toilets increased rapidly since 1976. In 2015, only 1% of all toilets produced by this company were squat toilets.

Since the 1960s, the trend has been to replace squat toilets at schools and public places with sitting toilets. This trend was thought to accelerate in the run-up to the 2020 Summer Olympics in Tokyo.

Since the 1980s, high-tech sitting toilets are emerging that replace traditional squat toilets, especially in urban areas. One of those toilets with the brand name "Washlet" includes a "posterior wash" before wiping, and features heated toilet seats. However, many rural people have no experience with such high-tech toilets and need detailed instructions. High-tech sitting toilets have also become commonplace in South Korea.

Gallery

See also 
 Bidet
 Bidet shower
 Toilet paper
 Levator ani#Puborectalis muscle

References

External links 

Squatting position
Toilet types